"Time Marches On" is a song written by Bobby Braddock, and recorded by American country music artist Tracy Lawrence.  It was released in March 1996 as the second single and title track from his album Time Marches On.  It was the 15th chart single of his career.  It spent three weeks at Number One on the Billboard country charts in mid-1996, becoming the longest-lasting Number One hit of his career. It also received a Single of the Year nomination from the Country Music Association in 1996, as well as a Song of the Year nomination for both 1996 and 1997.

Background
The song is in a moderate tempo in the key of A major with a vocal range of A3-F5. It features three verses, with a bridge preceding the third. The introduction and interludes follow a chord pattern of A-Fm for four measures. Each verse uses that same chord pattern for four measures, followed by D-Bm for two measures, two more A-Fm measures, ending on Bm-Fm-Bm-A. The bridge uses D-Bm twice, A-Fm twice, D-Bm twice again, and ends on E-Bm-D-E-A. After the third verse, Lawrence sings the line "Time marches on" several times over the chord pattern Fm-Bm-A.

Content
The song details various events in the lives of a married couple and their two children, starting with the children's young childhoods, then moving through their adolescences and adulthoods. In the bridge, the narrator observes that "the only thing that stays the same is that everything changes". By the final verse, the children have grown up and moved away, the daughter is now a single grandparent, the son is on a diet to control his high cholesterol, the mother is senile (possibly Alzheimer's) and the father has died. Each verse also references various items of pop culture.

Critical reception
Deborah Evans Price, of Billboard magazine in her review of the album called the song a "quirky kind of 'Pilgrim's Progress' set in the saga of a white-trash family." Price also reviewed the song as an official single. She called it an "intriguing song that chronicles the life of a family in different stages; it uses vivid images that connect the listener to the lyric through the characters and cultural references." She goes on to say that "Lawrence's delivery and Cook's production are right on target..."

Music video
The music video was directed by Marc Ball and premiered in March 1996. It shows Lawrence performing in front of an audience. It was released as part of Lawrence's Unplugged series, filmed in February 1996.

Chart positions
"Time Marches On" debuted at number 64 on the U.S. Billboard Hot Country Singles & Tracks for the week of March 23, 1996.

Year-end charts

References

1996 songs
1996 singles
Tracy Lawrence songs
Songs written by Bobby Braddock
Song recordings produced by Don Cook
Atlantic Records singles